Amirkola is a city in Mazandaran Province, Iran.

Amirkola or Amir Kola may refer to:
 Amir Kola, Gilan
 Amir Kola, Babol Kenar, Mazandaran Province
 Amir Kola, Savadkuh, Mazandaran Province